Nasielsk  is a small town in Masovian Voivodeship, Poland. In 2020, the population of the town was estimated at 7,650 residents.

History

An early Lechitic (proto-Polish) fortified settlement was built in the 9th century, and the region became part of the emerging Polish state in the 10th century. Nasielsk was first mentioned as Nosidlsk in 1065, in the so-called Mogilno Falsification of King Boleslaus II the Generous for the Benedictine Abbey at Mogilno. As the document states, the gord of Nosidlsk was an important center of defence, trade and administration. In the past, the name of the town was spelled in different forms: Nasilzco, Nosidlsk, Nosylsk, Nosydlsk, Nosielsk, Nosselia, Nosidlsko, Nasidlsko, Nosilsko, Nasilsko, Nasylsco. In 1155, a document issued for Duke Boleslaus IV the Curly confirmed the existence of the gord at Nasielsk, stating that Nowa Wies near Nasielsk was granted to the abbey of Czerwińsk nad Wisłą. In 1257, Duke of Siemowit I of Masovia granted one-third of Nasielsk to the Czerwinsk Abbey.

By the late 13th century, Nasielsk emerged as the seat of a castellany. The first document that confirms this fact was issued in 1297, with the notice of "comes Thomas castellanus de Nosylk”. On November 11, 1386, Janusz I of Warsaw granted the remaining part of the town of Nasielsk (civitas Nostra Nosielsko) to the knight Jakusz of Radzanow (Prawdzic coat of arms). Jakusz, who came to be known as Jakusz Bialy of Nasielsk, became the castellan of Nasielsk, and the town remained the property of his family until 1647. The coat of arms of Nasielsk is based on the Prawdzic symbol.

The town with its wooden church of Saint Adalbert of Prague burned down in 1440, and five years later a new brick church was erected. Nasielsk for centuries remained in the private hands of the Nosielski and Wessel families. In the mid-18th century, the first synagogue was built, and in 1795, following the Third Partition of Poland, Nasielsk was incorporated into the Kingdom of Prussia, where it remained until 1807, when it became part of Napoleon's short-lived Duchy of Warsaw, and afterwards it was incorporated into Russian-controlled Congress Poland in 1815. Until 1866, Nasielsk was a private town. In 1877, a rail line from Warsaw to Gdańsk via Nasielsk was completed.

In 1918, Nasielsk returned to Poland, as the country regained independence. During the Polish-Soviet War, in August 1920, Polish forces won the Battle of Nasielsk against the advancing Red Army. In 1924, the town became a rail junction after completion of a line to Toruń.

Following the joint German-Soviet invasion of Poland, which started World War II in September 1939, the town was occupied by Germany until 1945, and the population was subjected to repressions. In December 1939, the Jews of Nasielsk were expelled to other towns and cities where they fell victim to various atrocities and the Holocaust. In April 1940, the Germans arrested the pre-war Polish mayor Feliks Rostkowski, and imprisoned him in a concentration camp; however, he survived and returned to Nasielsk after the war. In December 1940, the Germans expelled around 1,000 Poles from the town. Expelled Poles were held in a camp in Działdowo for two weeks, where they were stripped of valuables, and then deported in freight trains to the Radom District of the General Government, while their houses and workshops were handed over to German colonists as part of the Lebensraum policy. From 1941 to 1943, the Germans operated a forced labour camp in the town.

The first official inventory of important buildings in Poland, A General View of the Nature of Ancient Monuments in the Kingdom of Poland, led by Kazimierz Stronczynski from 1844–55, describes the Nasielsk Synagogue as one of Poland's architecturally notable buildings.

In 2009, Glenn Kurtz stumbled upon a home video shot by his family that included three minutes of footage in Nasielsk shot in 1938. Kurtz set out to restore the film and find the people in it. The book based on this journey is titled Three Minutes in Poland: Discovering a Lost World in a 1938 Family Film. In 2022, Bianca Stigter’s debut documentary Three Minutes: A Lengthening based on the book was released. It includes the three minute restored footage, with narration by Helena Bonham Carter.

Sports
The local football club is Żbik Nasielsk, with both men and women teams. Both teams compete in the lower leagues.

Cuisine
The officially protected traditional food produced in Nasielsk is local cold pressed linseed oil (as designated by the Ministry of Agriculture and Rural Development of Poland). The tradition of oil production in Nasielsk and its surroundings dates back hundreds of years. The oldest mention of an oil mill in the present-day district of Nowa Wieś comes from 1474.

Notable people 
 Dovid Bornsztain (1876–1942), third Sochatchover Rebbe
 Ola Jordan (born 1982), Polish-British professional dancer on the British TV show Strictly Come Dancing
 Renata Mauer (born 1969), sports shooter, double Olympic champion
 Tomasz Majewski (born 1981), shot putter, double Olympic champion

Notable fictional characters from Nasielsk 
T. O. Morrow (real name Tomek Ovadya Morah), DC Comics supervillain

References

External links
 Jewish Community in Nasielsk on Virtual Shtetl
 Jewish quarter in Poland - Collections Search - United States Holocaust Memorial Museum Glenn Kurtz's family video showing Nasielsk in 1938

Cities and towns in Masovian Voivodeship
Nowy Dwór Mazowiecki County